Cormac O'Brien (born 1967) is an American author.

O'Brien is most famous for three books: Secret Lives of the U.S. Presidents, Secret Lives of the First Ladies and Secret Lives of the Civil War. All three contain various anecdotes, ones which, according to the book jackets, "your teachers never told you about."

References

1967 births
Living people
American non-fiction writers